George G. Grainger (October 24, 1876 – May 4, 1944) was an American football player and coach.  He was the head football coach at Fordham University for one season in 1896, compiling a record of 1–0.

Head coaching record

References

1876 births
1944 deaths
19th-century players of American football
Fordham Rams football coaches
Fordham Rams football players
Sportspeople from Manhattan
Players of American football from New York City